SMTI may refer to:
 SAF Medical Training Institute
 Sekolah Menengah Teknik Ipoh Persiaran Brash
 Shin Megami Tensei
 Stationary-moving target indication
 Stable marriage problem with ties and indifference